Pauls Toutonghi (born 1976) is a first-generation American fiction and non-fiction writer. He was born in America to immigrant parents. Pauls' mother emigrated from Latvia, while his father emigrated from Egypt.

His first novel, Red Weather, was published by Random House/Shaye Areheart Books in 2006. His second, Evel Knievel Days, was published by Random House/Crown in 2012.

Red Weather was widely—and favorably—reviewed. Toutonghi has published work in Sports Illustrated, The Burnside Review, Glimmer Train, The Boston Review, One Story Magazine, and The New Yorker. His story, "Regeneration" won a Pushcart Prize in 2000.

Pauls received his MFA in poetry from Cornell University in 2003—followed by a PhD in English Literature in 2006. After his first novel was published, he moved from Brooklyn, New York to Portland, Oregon—where he now teaches as an Associate Professor of English at Lewis and Clark College.

He is the father of twins. His sister, Annette Toutonghi, is a professional actor. His dad, Joseph Toutonghi, died in December 2017.

References

21st-century American male writers
21st-century American novelists
American male novelists
American people of Latvian descent
American people of Egyptian descent
Cornell University alumni
Living people
1976 births